3,3'-Diiodothyronine, also known as 3,3'-T2, is a metabolite of thyroid hormone.

It is formed from the breakdown of triiodothyronine. Levels can be affected in certain disease states.

Reactions

References

Iodinated tyrosine derivatives
Human hormones
Hormones of the hypothalamus-pituitary-thyroid axis
Hormones of the thyroid gland
Thyroid